Worcester Park Football Club is an English football club based in Worcester Park in the London Borough of Sutton, England and part of the Worcester Park Athletic Club.

History
The history of Worcester Park Football Club is rather vague. It appears that the club was founded in 1900, but became more established in 1921 when WPAC inherited the ground at Green Lane known as Skinners Field. Whether WPFC played at Skinners Field before 1921 is not known as it is believed that the field was part of church land.

In 1949, the football club was admitted to the old Surrey Senior League where it stayed throughout the fifties and early sixties before demotion to intermediate grade football. WPFC then became a founder member of the Surrey County Premier League in 1982 before its name change to the Surrey County Senior League in 2000. In 2003 it joined the Combined Counties League as part of the new Division 1.

In 2010–11 the club were Division One champions, but were unable to take promotion due to the lack of floodlights.  In 2015–16 the club won the Division One League Cup, beating Bedfont & Feltham 1–0 in the final. The following season they won the Surrey Premier Cup on penalties against Banstead Athletic. In 2017–18 the club were Division One champions again. However, they were then demoted to the Surrey Elite Intermediate League by the Football Association due to ground grading issues.

Other teams
The second team play in the Reserves division of the Surrey Elite Football Division and the third eleven (known as the 'A' team) play in the Surrey South Eastern Combination League Division 4.  The club also provides for a number of junior teams and a vets side.

Ground
Worcester Park play their home games at Skinners Field, Green Lane, Worcester Park, Surrey, KT4 8AJ.

The club had ongoing discussions regarding upgrades for the ground, to include floodlights, car park and seated viewing. However, they do not own Skinners field and planning permission rules mean this is unlikely to be achieved. The FA's rulings means that the club's tenure in the Combined Counties, at Step 6, may be limited.

Honours
Combined Counties League Division One
Champions 2010–11
Runners-up 2009–10
Combined Counties League Division One League Cup
Winners 2015–16
Surrey County Premier/Senior League
Champions 1999–2000, 2000–01
Runners-up 1995–96
Surrey FA Saturday Premier Cup :
Winners 2016–2017
Runners-up (2): 1983–84, 1999–00
Surrey Intermediate Cup:
 Winners (1): 1998–99
Surrey Junior Cup:
 Winners (1): 1937–38
Runners-up (1): 1938–39

References

External links
 Official website

Football clubs in England
Sport in the London Borough of Sutton
Football clubs in London
Surrey Senior League
Surrey County Senior League
Surrey South Eastern Combination
Combined Counties Football League